Gilbert Maurice Norman (7 April 1915 – 6 September 1944) was a British Army officer who served in the Special Operations Executive in France during World War II.

Norman was born in Saint-Cloud, Hauts-de-Seine, to an English father and a French mother and was educated in France and England. He joined the army, receiving a commission in the Durham Light Infantry in November 1940 and was subsequently recruited into the Special Operations Executive (SOE). In November 1942, he was sent into France to join the newly formed Prosper network, but on 24 June 1943 was arrested by the Gestapo, together with cell leader Francis Suttill and courier Andrée Borrel.

Norman was taken to the Paris headquarters of the Sicherheitsdienst at 84 Avenue Foch. The Germans used Norman's captured wireless set to transmit their own false messages to SOE Headquarters in Baker Street.  Norman attempted to warn London that he was in captivity by not giving the Germans the second part of his security check, which they did not know about. Omitting the security check from a message was specifically designed to act as a duress code which would warn London that the sender was being coerced. However, Norman was frustrated when London sent a curt reply telling him to correct the omission.

The Germans were thus able to set a trap which resulted in the capture of Jack Agazarian who had been sent with Nicholas Bodington to investigate the fate of the Prosper network.  Norman was shipped to Mauthausen concentration camp, where he was executed on 6 September 1944.

Major Gilbert Norman is honoured on the Brookwood Memorial in Surrey, England, and is also on the "Roll of Honour" on the Valençay SOE Memorial in the town of Valençay, in the Indre departément of France.

See also
 Timeline of SOE's Prosper Network

References
Notes

Bibliography
 

1915 births
1944 deaths
Military personnel from Paris
People from Saint-Cloud
Durham Light Infantry officers
British Special Operations Executive personnel
Executed spies
People who died in Mauthausen concentration camp
British Army personnel killed in World War II
British people executed in Nazi concentration camps
French people executed in Nazi concentration camps
Executed people from Île-de-France